Admiral Sir John Jeremy Black,  (17 November 1932 – 25 November 2015), known as Jeremy Black or J. J. Black, was a senior Royal Navy officer. He commanded the aircraft carrier  during the Falklands War, and later served as Commander-in-Chief Naval Home Command from 1989 until his retirement in 1991.

Naval career
Jeremy Black was born in Tavistock, Devon on 17 November 1932. He was educated at the Royal Naval College, when it was at Eaton Hall, and saw service in a number of theatres including Korea and Borneo. He was appointed a Member of the Order of the British Empire in 1960 for his work in Borneo but his most famous appointment was as captain of the aircraft carrier  during the Falklands War in 1982. Black was an inspirational leader to his crew: this was reflected by the ship's company designing T-shirts with 'There and Back with JJ Black' emblazoned across the front. This slogan later gave Black the title ('There and Back') of his memoirs.

In October 1982, Black was promoted to rear admiral and appointed Flag Officer First Flotilla. This was followed a position in the Ministry of Defence as Assistant Chief of the Naval Staff in 1984 before being appointed Deputy Chief of the Defence Staff (Systems) in 1986. He became Commander-in-Chief Naval Home Command in 1989. He retired in 1991.

Later life and death
In retirement Black held the posts of Rear-Admiral and then Vice-Admiral of the United Kingdom. Black was chairman of the Royal Navy Club of 1765 & 1785 (United 1889).

Black died after a long illness on 25 November 2015 at the age of 83.

Honours and awards
 8 June 1963 – Lieutenant Commander John Jeremy Black, Royal Navy is appointed a Member of the Order of the British Empire (MBE)
 8 October 1982 – Captain John Jeremy Black, MBE, Royal Navy is awarded the Distinguished Service Order (DSO): 
 31 December 1986 –  Vice Admiral John Jeremy Black, DSO, MBE is appointed a Knight Commander of the Order of the Bath (KCB).
 15 June 1991 – Admiral Sir (John) Jeremy Black, KCB, DSO, MBE, ADC is appointed a Knight Grand Cross of the Order of the British Empire (GBE)

Notes

External links
 Imperial War Museum Interview

|-

|-

|-

|-

1932 births
2015 deaths
Graduates of Britannia Royal Naval College
British military personnel of the Indonesia–Malaysia confrontation
Military personnel from Tavistock
Companions of the Distinguished Service Order
Knights Commander of the Order of the Bath
Knights Grand Cross of the Order of the British Empire
Royal Navy admirals
Royal Navy personnel of the Falklands War
Royal Navy personnel of the Korean War